Stanisławski (feminine: Stanisławska; plural: Stanisławscy) is a Polish locational surname, which originally meant a person from a place in Poland called Stanisław, Stanisławów, or Stanisławice, all of which in turn derive from the given name Stanisław.

The surname may refer to:

 Anna Stanisławska (1651–1701), Polish author and poet
 Danuta Stanisławska (born 1958), Polish field hockey player
 Gary Stanislawski (born 1959), American politician
 Holger Stanislawski (born 1969), German football player and manager
 Jan Stanisławski (painter) (1860–1907), Polish painter
 Jan Stanisławski (lexicographer) (1893–1973), Polish lexicographer
 Konstantin Stanislavsky (1863–1938), Russian actor and theater director
 Michael Stanislawski (born 1952), American historian
 Olga Stanisławska (born 1967), Polish writer and freelance journalist
 Teresa Stanisławska-Adamczewska (1924-2003), Polish writer
 Włodzimierz Stanisławski (born 1956), Polish field hockey player

See also
 
 
 Stanislavski

References

Polish-language surnames